Eupterote geminata is a moth in the family Eupterotidae. It was described by Francis Walker in 1855. It is found in India and Sri Lanka.

The wingspan is 58–80 mm. The forewings have a single medial indistinct slightly curved line. Both wings have a prominent postmedial slightly curved line.

The Global Lepidoptera Names Index gives this name as a synonym of Eupterote hibisci.

References

Moths described in 1865
Eupterotinae